Conchita Puig (born 18 January 1953) is a Spanish skier. She competed in Alpine skiing at the 1972 Winter Olympics.

References

1953 births
Living people
Alpine skiers at the 1972 Winter Olympics
Spanish female alpine skiers
Olympic alpine skiers of Spain
Place of birth missing (living people)